Katharine Waldo Douglas, CBE, (1870 – April 7, 1939) was an American novelist and translator. She was born in New York City, the daughter of Henry Livingston Douglas and Hortense Pauline Armstrong. Katharine married Francis Hunter in 1894. She later married the artist Romilly Fedden. They lived in Chantemesle, France; their son, Robin Fedden, later wrote a well-regarded memoir titled Chantemesle.

Douglas wrote several books in the early 20th century, among them The Sign (1912), The Spare Room (1913), Shifting Sands (1914), The Rock (1915), The Basque Country (1921), and The Peacock's Tail (1925). She also published Manor Life in Old France; From the Journal of Sire de Gouberville in 1933.

Douglas was actively involved in relief work in London during World War I and was decorated by King George V for her efforts.

Douglas died of injuries received in the crash of the Sud Express near Tolosa on March 29, 1939. Romilly Fedden died in the same crash.

References

External links
 

American women novelists
Novelists from New York (state)
1870 births
1939 deaths
20th-century American novelists
American translators
20th-century American women writers
Railway accident deaths in Spain